Chirumamilla is a village (Gram Panchayati) located in Nadendla Mandal, Narasaraopet revenue division, originally Guntur district, but after district reorganization, now under Palnadu District in the Indian state of Andhra Pradesh. It is known as the hometown of famous people like Kasu Brahmananda Reddy Garu, ex. Chief Minister of United Andhra Pradesh who also serves as the Minister of Home Affairs of the Indira Gandhi cabinet as well as the Governor of Maharashtra. Also, other notable politicians included Dodda Balakoti Reddy, ex. Member of Legislative Assembly, ex. Chairman of Guntur Zilla Parishad, ex. Chariman of Guntur Mirchi Yard, and many more.

Not only are there politicians, but also famous business people like Nadikattu Rami Reddy Garu, Chairman of Golkonda Group of Companies, also start their journey from this village.

Governance 

Chirumamilla gram panchayat is divided into wards and each ward is represented by a ward member. The total villages are represented by the Gram Sarpanch (President) and another Vice Sarpanch (Vice President).

Currently, Singareddy Bhulakshmi is represented as the Gram Sarpanch from YSRCP.

Education 

For the past decades, there was no proper education system available at Chirumamilla. Students could only achieve a primary education. However, in 2009, funding for a high school was granted by Shri Nadikattu Rami Reddy, who had a special interest in the village. He helped build a secondary school with help of the people of Chirumamilla. The school is known as Zilla Parishad High School and has one AP Model School.

See also 
List of villages in Guntur district

References 

Villages in Guntur district